Dhaka City Corporation (DCC) was the former self-governing corporation that was entrusted with the task of administering the municipal affairs of Dhaka. The incorporated area was divided into several wards. Each ward has an elected ward commissioner. The mayor of the city was elected by popular vote every five years, although the last mayoral election took place in 2002. The corporation was dissolved by the Local Government (City Corporation) Amendment Bill 2011 on 29 November, passed in the Parliament of Bangladesh, and formally ceased to exist on 1 December 2011, following the President's approval, making way for a Dhaka North and a Dhaka South city corporations.

History

Dacca Municipality, the predecessor of the city corporation, was established on 1 August 1864. The first elected chairman was Ananda Chandra Roy. Prior to that, a Committee for the improvement of Dacca was formed in 1823. The Act of 1884 added the provision of elected representatives called commissioners. In 1978, it gained status as Dhaka Municipality Corporation, and in 1990, it became Dhaka City Corporation. It is divided into 90 wards. In 1982, two adjoining municipalities, Mirpur and Gulshan, were merged with Dhaka Municipality. The Administrator of Dhaka Municipal Corporation, after Bangladesh was formed was Lt. Col. Hesamuddin Ahmed psc (Retd). In 1983, it was renamed as Dhaka Municipal Corporation. Finally, in 1990, it was renamed as Dhaka City Corporation. Until 1994, mayors were appointed by the government. The first elected mayor by popular vote took office in 1994, late Mayor Mohammad Hanif was the first elected Mayor of Dhaka. Annisul Huq was elected mayor of the Dhaka North City Corporation in April 2015.

Bifurcation 

The Awami League government on 29 November 2011 dissolved the Dhaka City Corporation by the Local Government (City Corporation) Amendment Bill 2011 passed by the Parliament of Bangladesh after being placed in the Parliament on 23 November. The city corporation will be split into two corporations, North and South, with the southern wing holding more territory than the north. Each corporation will be a self-governing entity, thus giving the city of Dhaka two mayors. The government holds that bifurcation would ensure better quality of civic services to the denizens of the city.

Dhaka North City Corporation 
Dhaka North City Corporation consists of 54 wards covering the thanas of Mirpur, Mohammadpur, Sher-e-Bangla Nagar, Pallabi, Adabor, Kafrul, Dhaka Cantonment, Tejgaon, Gulshan, Rampura, Banani, Bimanbandar, Khilkhet, Vatara, Badda, Uttara & some others. The current mayor of Dhaka North City Corporation is Atiqul Islam.

Dhaka South City Corporation 
Dhaka South City Corporation consists of 75 wards covering the thanas of  Paltan, Motijheel, Jatrabari, Kotwali, Sutrapur, Bangsal, Wari, Ramna, Gendaria, Chowkbazar, Lalbagh, Hazaribagh, Dhanmondi, Shahbagh, New Market, Khilgaon, Kamrangirchar & some others. The current mayor of Dhaka South City Corporation is Sheikh Fazle Noor Taposh.

Opposition to the bifurcation 

The split was condemned by opposition party BNP, some citizens, and even by members of the incumbent government. Incumbent mayor Khoka (who lost his seat) of BNP promised that he would not contest the next city elections if the government would let the city not be split. He also promised that the split will be scrapped once BNP returns to power. Incumbent councillors as well as staff of the former City Corporation went on strike if the bill was passed. Protesting staff of the corporation were met with an armed police force.

There were calls by some for a referendum before the split was made.

Since only the corporations are being split without a split in service providing agencies, this may give rise to a messy situation with a bureaucratic bottleneck, causing co-ordination failure amongst the services provided to the citizens. Some have suggested that the creation of two corporations will result in a greater payment in taxpaying money for administrative expenses, without a guarantee of improvement in civic services.

Since the Constitution of Bangladesh names Dhaka as the capital of Bangladesh, some legal experts believe that the law may be challenged as a violation of the constitution. To this end, Khoka filed a writ petition at the High Court challenging the new law after it was passed; the court, in turn, asked the government to show cause as to why the split was not illegal or unconstitutional.

References

External links
 Dhakacity.org Official Dhaka City website

Government of Dhaka
City Corporations of Bangladesh
Defunct companies of Bangladesh